Caelostomus amaroides is a species of ground beetle in the subfamily Pterostichinae. It was described by Boheman in 1848.

References

Caelostomus
Beetles described in 1848